Marcus Octavius (Latin: , lived during the 2nd century BC) was a Roman tribune in 133 BC and a major rival of Tiberius Gracchus. He was a son of Gnaeus Octavius, the consul in 165 BC, and a brother to another Gnaeus Octavius, the consul in 128 BC. Through his brother, he was the paternal uncle of Gnaeus Octavius, the consul in 87 BC.

A serious and discreet person, he earned himself a reputation as an influential orator. Though they had originally been close friends, Octavius became alarmed by Gracchus's populist agenda and, at the behest of the Roman senate, repeatedly vetoed Gracchus's programmes of land reform. Gracchus responded by ultimately having the Plebeian Assembly deprive him of his office and eject him from the Assembly's meeting place in 133 BC. This action led to a serious escalation in the confrontation between the traditionalists and the reformers. The action was unprecedented and contravened the mos maiorum (Latin phrase meaning "ancestral custom" or "way of the elders") leading to the overall destabilization of the Republic. The reason that the senate called Marcus Octavius to veto Tiberius Gracchus's land bill or programmes of land reform was because it was "going against the books" so to speak; it was a bit of an unorthodox plan that was not in tune with the traditional ways of Rome's political dealings. The senate felt threatened by this and was not going to simply let Tiberius Gracchus violate the traditions that Rome had traditionally valued. 

The bill's proposed solution was to address the lack of manpower for the empire at that time. Nonetheless, despite it having been well thought through, it still called for the Republic to move past Roman traditions, controversial because keeping old traditions was very important to the political elites of Rome. Still, Tiberius stood his ground and went against tradition because he believed in the potential of his land reform programmes. Because of his opposition, Tiberius decided it would be best to remove Marcus Octavius from office. Now because Tiberius Gracchus's vote to determine whether or not Marcus Octavius should be removed from office was successful in the sense that it was decided in Tiberius's favor, things were able to change. Once Marcus Octavius was removed from office, the Plebeian tribunes came together and reached the decision that the veto of Tiberius's programmes of land reform should be nullified. Marcus Octavius's veto was nullified and voided because he was no longer in office; because of this, his decision was revoked and no longer valid.

The primary source for Marcus Octavius is Plutarch's life of Tiberius. According to Plutarch, Gaius Octavius was one of his descendants, thus making him an ancestor of Roman Emperor Augustus.

See also
 Julio-Claudian dynasty
 Octavia (gens)
 Gracchi

References

2nd-century BC Romans
Octavii Rufi
Optimates